Impropriation, a term from English ecclesiastical law, was the destination of the income from tithes of an ecclesiastical benefice to a layman.  With the establishment of the parish system in England, it was necessary for the properties to have an owner.  This was the parochianus or parson/rector who was sustained by the benefice income while providing personally for the cure-of-souls.  The parson was technically a corporation sole.  With the passage of time, the benefice came to be considered a piece of property whose holder could discharge the spiritual responsibilities by a deputy and many were appropriated by monasteries or other spiritual corporations. These were bound to provide for a cleric for the cure of souls in the parish but could use any excess income as they pleased. The deputy was often known as the 'vicar'.

Impropriation was similar except that the recipient was a layman or secular corporation who was obliged to provide a cleric to serve the parish and for his maintenance. After 1200, no layman could have a cure of souls but grants were still occasionally made. When the monastic properties passed into lay hands at the Reformation, many appropriations were converted into impropriations, and in 1603 of a total 9,284 benefices an estimated 3,489 were in the hands of impropriators or lay rectors. By custom, they were obliged to maintain the chancel in good repair.

Controversy

Impropriations were deeply controversial because they were a form of simony. Impropriations could be purchased to increase the influence of one's favored interpretation of the Protestant movement.  This was problematic because churchgoers had little alternative to the official church and impropriations were used primarily during a religiously formative period in English history when power balance between Protestant (primarily between Established and Puritan) sects was of great moment. It was also criticized because, when used to increase a minister's power, the policy exacerbated the habit of "pluralism," where one minister would serve several churches, usually inadequately.

Puritan moves

Impropriations came under attack from the Puritans at the Hampton Court Conference of 1604. James I of England agreed to abolish them, but the reform was never acted on.

An organization of Puritans known as the Feoffees for Impropriations responded by raising funds. It was formally in existence from 1625 to 1633. Money was applied to buy impropriations and advowsons, thus allowing Puritan nominees to take over ministerial and lecturing positions. The suppression of the Feoffees, by legal action, was an early move of Laudianism.

Later history

A particular manifestation of the controversy brought about through Impropriation concerned the collecting of Tithes in the seventeenth century, of which the refusal to pay was an article of faith tenaciously held by the Quakers, especially in the period from 1652 to 1700.

See also
Advowson

Notes

References

Further reading
Eric J. Evans: "The Contentious tithe", RKP 1979
Christopher Hill, "Economic Problems of the Church" OUP, 1953
N. J, Morgan, "Lancashire Quakers and the Tithe"; Bulletin of JRUL, no 70, vol 3, 1988

Ecclesiology
History of the Church of England